Giovanni Piccolomini (1475–1537) was an Italian papal legate and cardinal. He was a nephew of Pope Pius III.

He was made Archbishop of Siena in 1503, Bishop of Sitten in 1522, Bishop of Aquila in 1523, Bishop of Albano in 1524, Bishop of Palestrina in 1531, Bishop of Porto e Santa Rufina in 1533, Bishop of Ostia in 1535. 

He was made Dean of the College of Cardinals in October 1534.

References

External links

1475 births
1537 deaths
16th-century Italian cardinals
Cardinal-bishops of Albano
Cardinal-bishops of Ostia
Cardinal-bishops of Palestrina
Cardinal-bishops of Porto
Diplomats of the Holy See
Deans of the College of Cardinals
Archbishops of Siena
Bishops in Tuscany
Bishops of L'Aquila
Bishops in Lazio
Giovanni